Kenawa Gamanga was a Paramount Chief of the Simbaru Chiefdom, in Kenema District, Sierra Leone. Boajibu, a town in Kenema District is the chiefdom headquarters.

References

Sierra Leonean royalty
Sierra Leonean Ahmadis
People from Kenema District